Chip Hourihan is an American film producer and director.

Early life and education
Hourihan was born in Concord, Massachusetts. He graduated from Phillips Exeter Academy and Yale University.

Work
His credits include:
 Frozen River, which won the Grand Jury Prize at the 2008 Sundance Film Festival, and was acquired by Sony Pictures Classics and by Rezo Films.   Frozen River received over 20 Best Picture and Best Actor nominations, won two Gotham Independent Film Awards and two Independent Spirit Awards, and was nominated for two Academy Awards.  Hourihan received a 2008 AFI Award from the American Film Institute for producing Frozen River.  
 Amateur, a Netflix Original Film written and directed by Ryan Koo, released in 2018.
 Any Day Now, which was released in 2012, and received multiple Audience Awards for Best Feature Film, as well as Best Actor Awards for Alan Cumming.  
 Mind the Gap, which won the Special Jury Prize at the South by Southwest Film Festival and was acquired by Showtime Entertainment.  
 Glissando, (wrote and directed), based upon a short story by Robert Boswell, which won numerous Best Picture and Best Actors awards on the film festival circuit.

References

External links

American film directors
American film producers
Living people
Year of birth missing (living people)
Yale University alumni